Zachary Knight Galifianakis (born October 1, 1969) is an American actor and comedian. He appeared in Comedy Central Presents special and presented his show Late World with Zach on VH1. Since 2008 he has hosted the Funny or Die talk show Between Two Ferns with Zach Galifianakis. He starred in the FX series Baskets and was nominated for the Primetime Emmy Award for Outstanding Lead Actor in a Comedy Series in 2017.

Galifianakis has starred in films including The Hangover trilogy (2009–2013), Due Date (2010), It's Kind of a Funny Story (2010), The Campaign (2012), Birdman or (The Unexpected Virtue of Ignorance) (2014) and Masterminds (2016). He has also voiced characters in animated films such as Puss in Boots (2011), The Lego Batman Movie (2017), Missing Link (2019), Ron's Gone Wrong (2021) and The Bob's Burgers Movie (2022).

Early life
Zachary Knight Galifianakis was born in North Wilkesboro, North Carolina, on October 1, 1969. He is the son of community arts center director Mary Frances (née Cashion) and heating oil vendor Harry Galifianakis. His mother is of Scots-Irish and English descent, while his paternal grandparents were Greek immigrants from Crete. He was baptized in his father's Greek Orthodox faith. He has a younger sister, Merritt, and an older brother, Greg. His cousin is Washington Post cartoonist Nick Galifianakis, while his uncle, also named Nick Galifianakis, is a politician. Galifianakis attended Wilkes Central High School, Wilkes Community College and subsequently attended North Carolina State University, where he majored in communications. While in college, he worked at a public access station. He taught a waltz class in 1991 where he crossed paths with Mary J. Blige.

Career

Early work
After his television debut Boston Common, Galifianakis joined Saturday Night Live for two weeks. He has stated "I worked on Saturday Night Live for two weeks, and Britney Spears was the host one week when I was doing it. Wrote a sketch, Will Ferrell was going to play a bodyguard to her belly button, and we were going to shrink Will down to fit into a belly button. ...she just stared at me after I explained it to her. And then she finally goes 'Yeah that's funny.'"  Galifianakis co-starred in the film Out Cold, and had small roles in Corky Romano, Below, Bubble Boy, Heartbreakers, Into the Wild, Super High Me, Little Fish Strange Pond and Largo.

In September 2001, he appeared in an episode of Comedy Central Presents. It included a stand-up routine, a segment with a piano, and a cappella group The Night Owls  (introduced as his "12 ex-girlfriends") singing "Eternal Flame" by The Bangles while he made jokes. In 2002, he hosted his own VH1 talk show called Late World with Zach. It featured many of his friends and regular performers from the Los Angeles comedy and music venue Largo where he appeared frequently during this time period. He played Davis in the Fox drama series Tru Calling. He appeared many times on Jimmy Kimmel Live! and played Frisbee in Reno 911!.

Galifianakis played Alan Finger on the Comedy Central show Dog Bites Man, a fake news program that caught people during candid moments thinking they were being interviewed by a real news crew. He also guest-starred in the episode of the Comedy Central show The Sarah Silverman Program as Fred the Homeless Guy. He also had a recurring guest role as a doctor on the animated Adult Swim show Tom Goes to the Mayor and appeared in several episodes of Tim and Eric Awesome Show, Great Job! in a recurring role as Tairy Greene.

In 2006, Galifianakis appeared in Fiona Apple's music video for the song "Not About Love", where he is seen lip-syncing the lyrics to the song. A year later, Kanye West employed Galifianakis and indie rock musician Will Oldham for similar purposes in the second version of the video for his song "Can't Tell Me Nothing". In June 2006, Galifianakis released the single "Come On and Get It (Up in 'Dem Guts)", a comedic hip-hop dance song which features Apple's vocals.

Galifianakis, Patton Oswalt, Brian Posehn and Maria Bamford, are the four Comedians of Comedy, a periodic packaged comedy tour in the style of The Original Kings of Comedy and the Blue Collar Comedy Tour. They chose to perform at live rock clubs as opposed to comedy clubs to try to reach a different audience. Much of the tour was taped and has been featured in both a short-lived TV series on Comedy Central and a full-length film that has appeared at SXSW and on Showtime. On February 22, 2008, he made an appearance on the Jackassworld.com: 24 Hour Takeover. He interviewed various members of the Jackass cast. Galifianakis starred in first leading role in the independent film Visioneers which premiered in 2008. The film was released on direct-to-DVD. That same year, Galifianakis appeared in a web video series of advertisements for Absolut vodka, along with Tim Heidecker and Eric Wareheim, creating a parody of the Golden Girls in which one has a deep anger issue, breaking the fourth wall in exasperation and outright violence on the set. He also completed the pilot Speed Freaks for Comedy Central.

His 2006 stand-up concert film Zach Galifianakis Live at the Purple Onion was one of the first original programs from Netflix.

Between Two Ferns with Zach Galifianakis

Galifianakis has a series of videos on the Funny or Die website titled Between Two Ferns With Zach Galifianakis where he conducts interviews with popular celebrities between two potted ferns. He has interviewed Jimmy Kimmel, Michael Cera, Jon Hamm, Natalie Portman, Charlize Theron, Bradley Cooper, Carrot Top, Conan O'Brien, Andy Richter, Andy Dick, Ben Stiller, Steve Carell, Sean Penn, Bruce Willis, Tila Tequila, Jennifer Aniston, Will Ferrell, Samuel L. Jackson, Tobey Maguire, Arcade Fire, Justin Bieber, Brie Larson, David Letterman, former President Barack Obama, Hillary Clinton, and Brad Pitt. His interview style consists of typical interview questions, bizarre non sequiturs, awkward product endorsements and sometimes inappropriate sexual questions and comments. Galifianakis won the Primetime Emmy Award for Outstanding Short-Format Live-Action Entertainment Program as a producer of the show at the 66th Primetime Creative Arts Emmy Awards.

Mainstream performances
Galifianakis played Alan Garner in the hit comedy The Hangover and earned the MTV Movie Award for the Best Comedic Performance. He was also prominently advertised in subsequent films that featured him in supporting roles, such as G-Force, Youth in Revolt and Up in the Air.

Galifianakis starred in the HBO series Bored to Death and hosted Saturday Night Live on March 6, 2010 during the show's 35th season, during which he shaved his beard mid-show for a sketch, and closed the show wearing a fake one. He hosted again on March 12, 2011 and shaved his head this time, in a Mr. T-like hairstyle, which was allegedly supposed to be used for a sketch that never aired due to time constraints.

In 2010, he starred in several films, including Dinner for Schmucks, It's Kind of a Funny Story, and Due Date. On October 29, 2010, while debating marijuana legalization on the show HBO's Real Time with Bill Maher, Galifianakis appeared to have smoked marijuana on live television; host Bill Maher denied that it was real marijuana in an interview with Wolf Blitzer during an episode of The Situation Room. In 2011, he reprised his role for The Hangover Part II, which was set in Thailand and voiced Humpty Dumpty in Puss in Boots. Galifianakis starred alongside Will Ferrell in Jay Roach's 2012 political comedy The Campaign. He received critical praise for his performance in the 2014 film Birdman or (The Unexpected Virtue of Ignorance), in which he starred with Michael Keaton, Emma Stone and Edward Norton. In 2017, Galifianakis voiced The Joker in The Lego Batman Movie. In February 2023, Galifianakis joined the live-action film adaptation of Lilo & Stitch as Pleakley.

Charity work
In January 2014, Galifianakis and his Night of a Thousand Vaginas co-star Sarah Silverman announced their intention to raise $20,000 to help fund the Texas Abortion Fund, part of a nationwide network of funds set up to assist women in obtaining abortions in states whose legislatures had placed restrictions on the practice. The fundraiser was set up in response to the passage of Texas H.B. 2, which established several restrictions that forced a majority of the state's abortion clinics to close.

Galifianakis befriended Marie "Mimi" Haist, a homeless woman in her 80s who was living in a Santa Monica laundromat for 18 years, and bought her an apartment across the street from the laundromat. The story was revealed in the 2015 documentary Queen Mimi.

Personal life
In August 2012, Galifianakis married Canadian charity worker Quinn Lundberg at the UBC Farm in Vancouver. They have two sons together: one born on September 7, 2013 (Galifianakis skipped the premiere of his film Are You Here to attend the birth) and another born on November 7, 2016.

Galifianakis has a house in Venice, Los Angeles and previously lived in Brooklyn. Galifianakis owns a farm in Sparta, North Carolina, and splits his time between the farm and his work. He said, "My farm is a place that I get to think clearly and pretend to know what I am doing." He also resides on an island in British Columbia, Canada.

In 2022 Galifianakis became the godfather to his niece Katerina.

Filmography

Film

Television

Video games

Music videos

Awards and nominations

References

External links

 
 
 

1969 births
Living people
20th-century American comedians
20th-century American male actors
21st-century American comedians
21st-century American male actors
American cannabis activists
American comedy musicians
American film producers
American male comedians
American male film actors
American male television actors
American male television writers
American male voice actors
American male web series actors
American stand-up comedians
American television writers
American people of Greek descent
American people of Scottish descent
Funny or Die
Zach
Late night television talk show hosts
Male actors from North Carolina
North Carolina Democrats
North Carolina State University alumni
Outstanding Performance by a Cast in a Motion Picture Screen Actors Guild Award winners
People from Wilkesboro, North Carolina
Primetime Emmy Award winners
Screenwriters from North Carolina
Streamy Award winners